The Brunswick and Birmingham Railroad (B&B) was a railroad in southeastern United States. It was chartered on December 11, 
1900. In 1902–03, it built a  line from Brunswick, Georgia to Offerman, Georgia and a  line from Bushnell, Georgia to Ocilla, Georgia. The B&B purchased the Offerman and Western Railroad on July 1, 1902, and the Ocilla and Irwinville Railroad on February 19, 1903. The railroad ran into financial troubles and was purchased by the Atlantic and Birmingham Railway in April 1904. 

The segment of the line built between Birmingham, Alabama and Alma, Georgia was abandoned by the Atlantic Coast Line Railroad in 1953. The remainder of the line survived the 1967 merger of the ACL and SAL to form the Seaboard Coast Line Railroad, and the acquisition of the Family Lines (CRR, L&N, GA, AWP) into the Seaboard System Railroad in 1982. After being purchased by CSX Transportation, the line between Nicholls, Georgia and Alma was abandoned in 1986.

The railroad's headquarters are today the Ritz Theatre in the Brunswick Old Town Historic District.

References

External links
Brunswick & Birmingham Railroad, Steve Storey, Georgia's Railroad History & Heritage
Brunswick & Birmingham Railroad Office, Steve Storey, Georgia's Railroad History & Heritage

Defunct Georgia (U.S. state) railroads
Railway companies established in 1900
Railway companies disestablished in 1904
Predecessors of the Atlantic Coast Line Railroad